A retractile drawbridge is a rare type of moveable bridge in which the span is pulled away diagonally on rails. It is a variant of the retractable bridge. Only four examples are known to exist in the United States. It is believed to have been invented by T. Willis Pratt in the 1860s.

References

Bridges